Moskwa TV was a German electronic dance music band.

Biography

In the early 1980s, Andreas Tomalla (aka Talla 2XLC) began his career as a DJ in Frankfurt, and put on preferably Kraftwerk and Depeche Mode. Together with Ralf Henrich (aka RaHen), he founded the band Moskwa TV, with a very modern techno sound for the time. The ground-breaking debut album Dynamics & Discipline was mainly composed by Talla and RaHen, and produced by Kurt Ader and Axel Henninger / Naskrent in the Dynaton Studio.

Vocalist Ion Javelin (Jan Veil) joined during the production of the debut album at the recommendation of label CBS to the band. At CBS, he had released his first single, "Dancing in Heaven", under the pseudonym Gary Chandler, with little commercial success. RaHen and Javelin together composed the song "Generator 7/8".

The singles "Generator 7/8" and "Tekno Talk" were released and gained popularity in various clubs in the Frankfurt techno scene and then at larger venues.

The release of the second studio album Blue Planet (1987) led to disputes between the band members. Talla 2XLC thought Ion Javelin had too much clout over the band, so he looked for a new singer. However he disliked the candidates and backpedaled, bringing Javelin back to the band. Talla 2XLC then left the band because of disputes with Axel Henninger and Ion Javelin concerning the rights to the band's songs.

In 1988, Axel Henninger left Moskwa TV, due to money disputes about his producer activity with the label Westside. The naming rights remained with Ion Javelin, whose label Westside agreed with Talla 2XLC financially.

Axel Henninger has produced Camouflage, Paddy Goes To Holyhead, Okay, Deborah Sasson, Chandeen, X-Perience, and De/Vision.

In 2003, Javelin released the album Broken Surface together with Chandeen's Harald Löwy.

Members
 Talla 2XLC (Andreas Tomalla)
 Axel Henninger
 Ion Javelin (Jan Veil)
 RaHen (Ralf Henrich)

Discography

Studio albums
 1985: Dynamics & Discipline
 1987: Blue Planet
 1991: Javelin
 1992: Dynamics + Discipline (re-release of the debut album with a slightly different track list)

Singles
 1985: Generator 7/8
 1985: Tekno Talk
 1985: Tekno Talk (Bombing Mix)
 1986: Generator 7/8 (Remix)
 1986: Art of Fashion
 1987: Brave New World
 1987: Moskwa Electronic / Brave New World
 1988: Generator 7/8 – 88
 1991: Tell Me, Tell Me

External links
 Moskwa TV at Discogs
 Ion Javelin's Myspace

German electronic music groups